Jason Dorland (born 26 August 1964) is a Canadian rower. He competed in the men's eight event at the 1988 Summer Olympics.

He studied advertising design at Syracuse University, in Syracuse, New York, but transferred to the University of Victoria in British Columbia to train with the Canadian national rowing team. He was later a rowing coach, returning to Shawnigan Lake School in 1990.

References

External links
 

1964 births
Living people
Canadian male rowers
Olympic rowers of Canada
Rowers at the 1988 Summer Olympics
Rowers from St. Catharines